In July 2016, 101 British Aerospace Jetstream were in airline service : 75 in Americas, 15 in Europe, 7 in Asia Pacific & Middle East and 4 in Africa ; its airline operators with five or more aircraft were :
 9:	Northwestern Air
 8:	Pascan Aviation
 7:	SARPA
 6:	AIS Airlines and :es:Servicios Aéreos Profesionales
 5:	Aerolinea de Antioquia and Transmandu

Current civil operators

Aerochaco

de Bruin Air
FlyPelican

Pascan Aviation
Starlink Aviation
East Coast Airways
Northwestern Air Lease
InfinitAir
West Wind Aviation

Moon Flights
SARPA
Horizontal de aviación

Aerolíneas Mas
Servicios Aereos Profesionales

Avies

Daya Aviation

Tortug Air
Sunrise Airways

Aerolineas Sosa
Lanhsa Airlines

Flugfélagið Ernir

Skylan Airways

Aero Pacífico

AIS Airlines

Inflite Charters Ltd
Originair

Helitrans

Servicios Aéreos Tarapoto

Mid-Sea Express

Aero VIP (Portugal)

Amapola Flyg

Redstar Aviation

Amber Airways
Cranfield University
Eastern Airways

AeroAndinas

Proflight Zambia
Briko air services

Yeti Airlines

Former civil operators

Aerovip

Aeropelican Air Services
Aircruising Australia
Australian Airlines
Brindabella Airlines
Eastern Australia Airlines
Maroomba Airlines
O'Connor Airlines
Skywest Airlines
Tasair

 Air BC (as Air Canada Connector for Air Canada)
Air Mikisew
Air Sask Aviation
Alberta Citilink
Capital City Air
Corporate Express
Integra Air
North Vancouver Air
Ontario Express (as Canadian Partner for Canadian Airlines)
Peace Air
Quik Air
Quik Pass
Skyservice Airlines
SkyXpress Airlines
Swanberg Air
Transwest Air
West Wind Aviation

Pan Am World Airways Dominicana

Blue1

Salsa d'Haiti
Tortug' Air

J-Air

Blue Islands

NetherLines

Air National
Origin Pacific Airways
Vincent Aviation

Coast Air

 Ladesa

 Jet Air

Angel Airlines

Brymon European Airways
BVI Airways (in the British Virgin Islands)
Links air

 Air LA
Air Midwest
Air New Orleans
 Air Virginia (AVAir)
 Appalachian Air
 Atlantic Coast Airlines (as United Express for United Airlines)
 Atlantis Airlines (as Eastern Express for Eastern Airlines)
 Braniff Express (operated by Air Midwest)
CCAir (as US Airways Express for US Airways)
Chautauqua Airlines (as USAir Express for USAir)
 Chicago Express Airlines (as ATA Connection for ATA Airlines)
Colgan Airways (as Continental Express for Continental Airlines)
Corporate Airlines (as American Connection for American Airlines and Trans World Express for Trans World Airlines (TWA)
 Corporate Express Airlines
 Discover Air
 Express Airlines I (as Republic Express for Republic Airlines and Northwest Airlink for Northwest Airlines)
 Express Airlines II 
Flagship Airlines (as American Eagle for American Airlines)
 Jetstream International Airlines (as USAir Express for USAir)
 Metro Airlines (as American Eagle for American Airlines and as Eastern Metro Express for Eastern Airlines)
Mid Pacific Air (as Reno Air Express for Reno Air)
North Pacific Airlines (as United Express for United Airlines)
 Pacific Skyway Airlines
Pan American World Airways (as Pan Am Express)
Pan American Airways (1998–2004) (as Pan Am Clipper Connection operated by Boston-Maine Airways)
Presidential Airways (as United Express for United Airlines)
 Sierra Expressway
Trans States Airlines (as American Connection for American Airlines, Trans World Express for Trans World Airlines (TWA) and USAir Express for USAir)
 WestAir (as United Express for United Airlines)
 Wings West Airlines (as American Eagle for American Airlines)

Military operators

 :
 Bolivian Air Force
 :
 Royal Saudi Air Force (retired Dec 2016)
 
 Royal Navy - Fleet Air Arm (retired 2011)
 750 Naval Air Squadron

Gallery

References 

Jetstream

Bibliography